State Highway 36 (SH 36) runs from Freeport to Abilene.  It was designated as the 36th Division Memorial Highway between Cameron and Sealy by the Texas Legislature in 1985.

History
SH 36 was originally proposed on November 21, 1917, as a route from Cisco to Waco. On December 20, 1917, this became part of SH 18. 

On November 20, 1917, an intercounty highway was designated from Goldthwaite to Temple. On January 24, 1918, the intercounty highway extended to Cameron. On March 18, 1918, the intercounty highway extended to Brenham. On March 20, 1918, SH 36 was designated as a route from Goldthwaite to Hearne. On January 23, 1919, SH 36 was extended to Richmond, and the old route had been changed to SH 36A. On March 19, 1919, SH 36 was extended to Freeport. On August 21, 1923, the sections from Temple to Goldthwaite and Richmond to Freeport were cancelled.  On January 16, 1928, SH 36 was extended back to Freeport. On September 19, 1929, SH 36 was extended northwest to Hamilton. On December 18, 1932, the route was extended to Rising Star, with the section from Hamilton to Comanche replacing part of SH 22. On February 10, 1933, the section from Rising Star to Comanche was cancelled. On July 10, 1933, the route was extended to its current terminus in Abilene. On October 4, 1935, the section from Cross Plains to Comanche was cancelled. On January 21, 1936, the section from Abilene to Cross Plains was cancelled. Later that year, the section from Temple to Gatesville was cancelled. On September 22, 1936, the section from Abilene to SH 191 was restored. On February 11, 1937, the sections from Temple to a lateral road (now SH 317) and from Rising Star to Comanche were restored. On April 28, 1937, the section from Rising Star to Comanche was cancelled again, but the section from the lateral road to Gatesville was restored. On May 18, 1937, the section from the lateral road to Gatesville was cancelled again, but the section from Rising Star to Comanche was restored. On November 5, 1937, the section from the lateral road to Gatesville was restored again. On January 6, 1939, SH 36 had been rerouted on its current route south of Temple. On August 31, 1939, the section from SH 191 to Rising Star was restored, but the section from Rising Star to northwest of Comanche was cancelled. On December 10, 1946, the section from Rising Star to northwest of Comanche was restored. Only minor route changes to bypass Brenham on June 4, 1964, Temple on January 24, 1978, and Freeport on January 28, 1985 were made.

SH 36A was a spur route of SH 36 designated on January 23, 1919, splitting off at Cameron and traveling east to Hearne as a replacement for part of SH 36, which was rerouted. On August 21, 1923, the route had been renumbered as SH 69. An alternate routing just south of Temple, serving the town of Heidenheimer, was designated on May 25, 1925. A new SH 36A was designated on September 18, 1929, from Temple to Valley Mills. On March 19, 1930, it was renumbered as SH 153 (now SH 317). The alternate route of SH 36 through Heidenheimer was changed to SH 36A that day. On August 27, 1935, the route had been renumbered SH 221.

SH 36B was a spur route of the original routing of SH 36 designated on July 20, 1920, splitting off at Lampasas and travelling southeast to Georgetown. On January 15, 1923, it extended to Brady. On August 21, 1923, it had been renumbered as SH 74 (now US 190 and US 183).

Business routes
SH 36 has two business routes.

Gatesville business loop

Business State Highway 36-E (Bus. The road was bypassed on April 18, 1986, by SH 36 and designated Loop 452. The road was redesignated as Business SH 36-E on June 21, 1990.

Brenham business loop

Business State Highway 36-J (Bus. The road was bypassed on June 4, 1964, and designated Loop 283. The road was designated as Business SH 36-J on June 21, 1990.

Proposed future Alternate 36
A group calling itself the Highway 36A Coalition has proposed a new highway (tentatively titled Highway 36A) which would run between SH 36 at Pleak and another planned route in Waller County (the proposed Prairie Parkway), ultimately connecting to SH 6 north of Hempstead. According to the Coalition, the new highway would be limited access (along with improvements to the existing Highway 36 between Freeport and Pleak) and provide a western bypass of the Greater Houston area (as well as a new hurricane evacuation corridor).

Major intersections

References

036
Transportation in Taylor County, Texas
Transportation in Callahan County, Texas
Transportation in Eastland County, Texas
Transportation in Comanche County, Texas
Transportation in Hamilton County, Texas
Transportation in Coryell County, Texas
Transportation in Bell County, Texas
Transportation in Milam County, Texas
Transportation in Burleson County, Texas
Transportation in Washington County, Texas
Transportation in Austin County, Texas
Transportation in Fort Bend County, Texas
Transportation in Brazoria County, Texas